Melanie McQuaid  (born May 17, 1973) is a Canadian triathlete. Competing in primarily XTERRA Triathlon, or cross triathlon, she has won three XTERRA World Championships as well as the ITU Cross Triathlon World Championship in 2011 and 2017. McQuaid also races in half-iron and Ironman 70.3 triathlon events, with half a dozen wins at this distance.

Career
McQuaid was born and raised in Victoria, British Columbia. She competed in swimming while in high school and ran while attending the University of Victoria, earning her degree in biochemistry and chemistry. She next pursued a professional career in road cycling and mountain biking after being offered many opportunities in cycling as a beginning woman cyclist. She raced her first World Cup race in 1998, but after not making the Canadian mountain bike team for the 2000 Olympics, and growing tired of the repetitiveness of the single sport, McQuaid began competing in XTERRA triathlon. She found that these events suited her perfectly because of her athletic background and strengths.

The success McQuaid has found in XTERRA and cross triathlon has translated into more than 40 wins since 2001. She has been named Triathlete Magazine'''s Offroad Triathlete of the Year for 2005 and 2009. She was Triathlon Canada's Female Offroad Triathlete of the Year four times. In 2006 and 2008 she won the Offroad Triathlete of the Year award at the Competitor'' Magazine Endurance Sport Awards.

References

External links

ITU Results

1973 births
Living people
Canadian female triathletes
University of Victoria alumni
Sportspeople from Victoria, British Columbia
20th-century Canadian women